Neustädter Kirche (new town church) is one of three large downtown churches of the Baroque old town of Erlangen. Germany. The church is Lutheran. It dominates the town, together with the Reformed Hugenottenkirche (church of the Huguenots) and the Lutheran Altstädter Kirche (old town church).

History
The decree on church planting was on 22 January 1703 by Margrave Christian Ernst signed.

The Franco-Prussian philosopher of law and conservative politician Friedrich Julius Stahl, later professor at the University of Erlangen, was baptised here on 6 November 1819. During World War II the church was severely damaged by bombs and rebuilt in 1955.

Architecture

The architecture of the church is the Old Church and Church of the Huguenots a unit. This is evident already at the location. Although all three churches are on the typical east-west axis, only the two Lutheran churches (Church of Old Town, New Town Church) always faces east, so constructed with the choir in the east. Its tower stands on the west side of the church. The Huguenot Church is configured exactly the reverse. The axis to form the main road. These are the two Lutheran churches are located approximately on a drawn from north to south axis, which has its center in the castle.

A striking feature of the facade is primarily the pillar system, which combines all three major inner city churches. Looking at the tower, it is found that it is divided into four. It can be found at its four corners from bottom to top: Doric capitals, Ionic capitals and Corinthian capitals. It is then one viewing platform at the center is then a small octagonal tower attachment.

Organ

The history of church organs in the New Town dates back to the year 1741, as the organ builder Johann Glis (Nuremberg), the first instrument with 31 registers built. The organ was rebuilt several times, including by expanding the scope of manual and pedal, new intonation, installing electro bag store, supplementing the planning, expansion to a third plant. From the original organ-Glis today the baroque enclosures are available, which was designed by the sculptor Anthony Merz, and three registers. Six registers from the years 1910 and 1919 (GF Steinmeyer & Co. Oettingen).

The present organ was created in 2004 and 2005 by the organ builder Goll (Lucerne / Switzerland), historical re-using existing structures. The instrument has 45 stops and three transmissions on three manuals and pedal. The disposition was created based on the Franco-baroque sound of Glis-organs. The Spieltrakturen are mechanical. The mechanical stop actions are equipped with electromagnets. Manual on the second chorus, the organ is playable, which is located behind the high altar. This instrument was built with 20 registers of the organ builder GF Steinmeyer & Co. (Oettingen) in 1919.

External links 

 Neustädter Kirchengemeinde official website 

Erlangen
Churches completed in 1703
1703 establishments in the Holy Roman Empire